Pikelner is an impact crater on the Moon's far side, named for the Russian astronomer Solomon Pikelner. It lies to the southeast of the larger crater Van der Waals, and to the north of the Vallis Planck cleft. Pikelner overlies more than half of the satellite crater Pikelner Y to the north. Almost contacting the southwestern outer rim of Pikelner is a larger concentric crater formation with the smaller crater of the pair, Pikelner S, along the northern edge of the pair.

The outer rim of Pikelner is well-defined with little erosion, giving it the appearance of a relatively young feature. The interior floor is somewhat uneven, possibly due to deposits of ejecta or fall-back material. It is free of impacts of note within the interior.

Satellite craters
By convention these features are identified on lunar maps by placing the letter on the side of the crater midpoint that is closest to Pikelner.

References

 
 
 
 
 
 
 
 
 
 
 
 

Impact craters on the Moon